The Miami Heat is an American professional basketball team based in Miami. They play in the Southeast Division of the Eastern Conference in the National Basketball Association (NBA). The team joined the NBA in 1988 as an expansion team, and won the NBA championship in 2006, 2012 and 2013. The team played its home games at the Miami Arena until 2000, and have played their home games at Miami-Dade Arena since then. The Heat is owned by Micky Arison. Its current staff consists of Pat Riley as team president and Erik Spoelstra as head coach.

The Heat started building their roster by selecting players in the 1988 NBA Expansion Draft and 1988 NBA draft. Since then, 217 players have appeared in at least one game for the franchise. Dwyane Wade is the most successful player in Heat history. His achievements include Finals Most Valuable Player Award in 2006, All-Star Game Most Valuable Player Award in 2010, 11 consecutive All-Star Game selections and eight All-NBA Teams selections. Alonzo Mourning, the franchise's first ever All-Star, won two Defensive Player of the Year Awards and was selected to five All-Star Games and two All-NBA Teams. LeBron James, who played four years with the Heat, won the Most Valuable Player Award in 2012 and 2013, the Finals Most Valuable Player Award in 2012 and 2013, and was selected to four consecutive All-Star Games and four consecutive All-NBA Teams. Tim Hardaway and Shaquille O'Neal are the only other Heat players who have been selected to both the All-Star Game and the All-NBA Team. Anthony Mason, Chris Bosh, Goran Dragić, Jimmy Butler, and Bam Adebayo are the only other Heat players who have been selected to the All-Star Game. Two Heat players have won the NBA Most Improved Player Award: Rony Seikaly in 1990 and Isaac Austin in 1997. Ten Heat players were selected to the All-Rookie Team. Mourning, Shaquille O'Neal and Gary Payton, who played two seasons for the Heat and was part of the Heat championship team in 2006, have been inducted to the Basketball Hall of Fame.  Ray Allen was inducted into the Naismith Memorial Basketball Hall of Fame in 2018, while Chris Bosh was inducted into the Naismith Memorial Basketball Hall of Fame in 2021. 

Udonis Haslem, who has played for the Heat since he entered the league in 2003, is the franchise's longest-serving player. Haslem has recorded more rebounds than any other Heat players. Wade has played more games, more minutes, scored more points, recorded more assists and more steals than any other Heat players. He also led the franchise in field goals made and free throws made. Mourning, who played 11 seasons with the Heat, is the franchise's third longest-serving player. He has blocked more shots than any other Heat players. The Heat have six retired jersey numbers: the number 3 worn by Dwyane Wade, the number 33 jersey worn by Alonzo Mourning, the number 10 jersey worn by Tim Hardaway, the number 1 jersey worn by Chris Bosh, the number 23 jersey worn by Michael Jordan, who has never played for the Heat and the number 32 jersey worn by Shaquille O'Neal. The Heat retired Jordan's number 23 jersey in April 2003 to honor Jordan's achievements and contributions in basketball. The Heat are the only NBA team other than the Chicago Bulls to have retired the number 23 jersey in honor of Jordan. Mourning had his number 33 jersey retired in March 2009, a year after he retired. Hardaway, who played six seasons with the Heat, had his number 10 jersey retired in October 2009.

List

International players

In the National Basketball Association (NBA), foreign players—also known as international players—are those who were born outside of the United States. Players who were born in U.S. overseas territories, such as Puerto Rico, U.S. Virgin Islands and Guam, are considered international players even if they are U.S. citizens. In some borderline cases, the NBA takes into consideration whether a player desires to be identified as international. 18 international players have played for the Heat. The first foreign-born Heat is Rony Seikaly, who was born in Lebanon. However, he grew up in Greece and played college basketball in the United States for Syracuse University. He was drafted ninth in the first round of the 1988 draft and became the Heat's first-ever draft pick.

The following is a list of international players who have played for the Heat, listed by their national team affiliation.

 Canada
 Joel Anthony
 Jamaal Magloire (born in Canada but never represented Canada internationally)

 China
 Wang Zhizhi

 Estonia
 Martin Müürsepp

 France
 Yakhouba Diawara
 Ronny Turiaf

 Gabon
 Stephane Lasme

 Georgia
 Vladimir Stepania (born in Georgian SSR, Soviet Union (now Georgia), represented Georgia internationally)

 Great Britain
 Luol Deng (born in Wau, Sudan (now South Sudan), became a naturalized British citizen, represented England internationally at youth level and now represents Great Britain internationally)

 Ireland
 Marty Conlon (born in the United States, represented Ireland internationally)

 Lebanon
 Rony Seikaly (born in the Lebanon, represented Lebanon internationally)

 Lithuania
 Žydrūnas Ilgauskas

 New Zealand
 Sean Marks
 Kirk Penney

 Puerto Rico
 Carlos Arroyo

 Serbia and Montenegro / FR Yugoslavia
 Miloš Babić (born in SR Serbia, SFR Yugoslavia (now Serbia), but never represented Serbia and Montenegro or FR Yugoslavia internationally)
 Predrag Danilović (born in SR Bosnia and Herzegovina, SFR Yugoslavia (now Bosnia and Herzegovina), represented SFR Yugoslavia and FR Yugoslavia internationally)

 Slovenia
 Goran Dragić
 Zoran Dragić
 Beno Udrih

 Sudan
 Manute Bol

Statistics leaders
Note: Statistics are correct through March 28, 2021.

Games

Minutes

Points

Field goals

3-point field goals

Free throws

Rebounds

Blocks

Assists

Steals

Single Game Leaders

Source: https://stathead.com/tiny/TdNjB

Source:https://stathead.com/tiny/PRdOg

Source: https://stathead.com/tiny/pH91B

Notes
 Players can sometimes be assigned more than one jersey number.
 Each year is linked to an article about that particular NBA season.
 Only includes achievements as Heat players.

References
General

 
 
 
 
 

Specific

External links
Miami Heat official website

National Basketball Association all-time rosters

roster